A strawberry cervix is a finding upon physical examination where the cervix has an erythematous, punctate, and papilliform appearance. It is named because of the superficial similar appearance to a strawberry. 

As opposed to a more general inflammation of the cervix found in cervicitis, the strawberry cervix appearance is considered to be selectively associated with Trichomonas infections. A clinician discovering this finding would have a high suspicion for Trichomonas infection.

See also
 Strawberry tongue
 Blueberry muffin baby
 Petechia

References

External links
 http://depts.washington.edu/nnptc/online_training/std_handbook/gallery/pages/strawberrycervix.html
 https://web.archive.org/web/20100402064515/http://www.usc.edu/student-affairs/Health_Center/adolhealth/content/b3stis3.html

Obstetrics